Donald Rosenfeld was the President of Merchant Ivory Productions from 1986 through 1998. Rosenfeld was the lead Producer on the major Merchant Ivory films created in what is now considered their Golden Decade. Along with Ismail Merchant, James Ivory and Ruth Prawer Jhabvala, Rosenfeld worked on the creation of the cinematic masterpieces Mr. & Mrs. Bridge, Howards End (8 Academy Award nominations), and The Remains of the Day (9 Academy Award nominations), among others. Rosenfeld was the youngest producer ever to become a member of the Academy of Motion Picture Arts and Sciences in 1992.

Life and work
From 1986 to 1998, Rosenfeld ran Merchant Ivory Productions, working for films including Slaves of New York to Surviving Picasso.

Rosenfeld has continued to produce major motion pictures, following his Merchant Ivory years. His films Color of a Brisk and Leaping Day as well as Forty Shades of Blue won the top prize at the Sundance Film Festival; and The Tree of Life, directed by Terrence Malick, won the top prize at the 64th Cannes Film Festival.

In 2008, in partnership with Andreas Roald, he founded Sovereign Films, producing together Effie Gray (written by and starring two-time Oscar winner, Emma Thompson), Cradle of Champions, and Terrence Malick's Voyage of Time.

He is a collector of contemporary art (primarily painting and photography) and resides in New York City.

Filmography 

Cradle of Champions (2018) by Battle Bull
Voyage of Time (2016) by Terrence Malick 
Effie Gray (2014) by Richard Laxton
Jodorowsky's Dune (2013) by Frank Pavich
The Tree of Life (2011) by Terrence Malick
Anton Chekhov's The Duel (2010) by Dover Koshashvili
Tonight at Noon (2009) by Michael Almereyda - Producer
Eugene O'Neill: A Documentary Film (2006 TV documentary) by Ric Burns - Executive Producer
William Eggleston in the Real World (2005 documentary) by Michael Almereyda - Executive Producer
Forty Shades of Blue (2005) by Ira Sachs - Producer
The American Experience (TV series documentary)
New York: Center of the World (2003) by Ira Sachs - Executive Producer
Mountain Men and Holy Wars (2003 documentary) by Taran Davies - Executive Producer
Acrobacias del corazón (2000) by María Teresa Constantini - Associate Producer
New York: A Documentary Film (1999 TV mini-series documentary) by Ric Burns - Producer
Rembrandt (1999) by Charles Matton - Associate Producer
Catwalk (1996 documentary) by Robert Leacock - Executive Producer
Color of a Brisk and Leaping Day (1996) by Chris Munch - Executive Producer
The Proprietor (1996) by James Ivory - Producer
Surviving Picasso (1996) by James Ivory - Executive Producer
Jefferson in Paris (1995) by James Ivory - Executive Producer
Feast of July (1995) by Christopher Meneul - Associate Producer
The Remains of the Day (1993) by James Ivory - Associate Producer
In Custody (1993) by Ismail Merchant - Executive Producer
Howards End (1992) by James Ivory - Associate Producer
The Ballad of the Sad Cafe (1991) by Simon Callow - Associate Producer
Mr. & Mrs. Bridge (1990) by James Ivory
Slaves of New York (1989) by James Ivory
The Perfect Murder (1988) by Zafar Hai - Co-producer

ActorThe Proprietor (1996) by Ismail Merchant - The Auction - Maître Ertaud''

References

External links

Year of birth missing (living people)
Living people
Vassar College alumni
American film producers